Luca Bianchin (born 15 November 1971) is an Italian swimmer. He competed in the men's 200 metre backstroke event at the 1992 Summer Olympics.

References

1971 births
Living people
Italian male swimmers
Olympic swimmers of Italy
Swimmers at the 1992 Summer Olympics
Swimmers from Milan
Italian male backstroke swimmers
20th-century Italian people